Ash Moeke (born 9 March 1988) is a New Zealand rugby union player.  He currently plays at French club Vannes having previously been playing as a First five-eighth for  the Southland Stags in the ITM Cup competition.

Playing career
Moeke began his professional rugby career for Northland Taniwha as a 20 year old before transferring to play for southern neighbours  Auckland before the 2009 Air New Zealand Cup. He spent the next two seasons playing for the province appearing in a total of 11 games before returning to the Taniwha where he established himself as the starting first five.

After spending two seasons as Northland's first five, Moeke headed to France where he represented Tarbes Pyrénées Rugby. He became known for his accurate kicking game both in general play and as a goal kicker as well as his ability to facilitate the game with his passing and running. After three years with the Pro D2 side Moeke returned to New Zealand where he signed with Southland Rugby as an insurance plan for incumbent five eighth Lima Sopoaga who was selected for the All Blacks after a strong Super Rugby season.

References

External links
Southland Player Profiles
Ash Moeke Career Statistics

1988 births
New Zealand rugby union players
Rugby union fly-halves
Living people
Southland rugby union players
Northland rugby union players
Auckland rugby union players
Rugby Club Vannes players
New Zealand expatriate rugby union players
New Zealand expatriate sportspeople in France
Expatriate rugby union players in France
Rugby union players from Auckland
People educated at Auckland Grammar School